Diamond Girl is the fifth studio album by pop/folk duo Seals and Crofts. It was released in 1973 on Warner Bros. Records.

Background 
The album contains a number of different musical styles and themes. "Nine Houses" is one of two intimate, religious songs, which the band would often reserve for after concert performances. "Ruby Jean and Billie Lee" is another, written for their spouses, Ruby Jean Anderson (Seals) and Billie Lee Day (Crofts).  The first verse is sung by Seals, and the second by Crofts, with both singing the chorus.  Their children (Lua Crofts and Joshua Seals) are mentioned in the chorus. 

Diamond Girl peaked at #4 on the U.S. album charts. Its title track "Diamond Girl" reached #6 on the Billboard Hot 100 chart in the summer and #13 in Canada. The follow-up single "We May Never Pass This Way (Again)" attained the #21 position late in the year (#33 in Canada).

Track listing 
All songs written by Jim Seals and Dash Crofts, unless otherwise indicated.

Side 1

Side 2

Charts

Personnel 
 Jim Seals – guitar, alto saxophone, vocals
 Dash Crofts – mandolins, vocals, Fender Rhodes electric piano
 Louie Shelton – guitar, producer
 David Paich – organ, piano
 Bobby Lichtig – bass, flute
 Wilton Felder – bass
 Jim Gordon – drums
 John Guerin – drums
 Harvey Mason – drums
 Jeff Porcaro – drums
 Bobbye Hall – percussion
 England Dan & John Ford Coley – backing vocals
 David Hassinger – engineer
 Steve Waldman – 2nd engineer
 Joseph Bogan – assistant engineer

References 

1973 albums
Seals and Crofts albums
Warner Records albums